Oklahoma has an extensive turnpike system, maintained by the state government through the Oklahoma Turnpike Authority. All of Oklahoma's turnpikes are controlled-access highways. The majority have at least four lanes, though the Chickasaw Turnpike is two lanes.

Tolls on Oklahoma's turnpikes are collected through several methods, particular to each turnpike, involving mainline and sidegate toll plazas. Tolls can be paid through cash (at either unstaffed exact-change bays or staffed booths, depending on the plaza) or through the Pikepass transponder system. In place of cash collection booths, PlatePay, a cashless pay-by-mail system, operates on the Kilpatrick Turnpike and the Kickapoo Turnpike.

Turnpikes
The Cherokee Turnpike is part of U.S. Highway 412 (US-412) in eastern Oklahoma,
The Chickasaw Turnpike connects US-177 just north of Sulphur to State Highway 1 (SH-1) south of Ada. The turnpike is two lanes for its entire length.
The Cimarron Turnpike begins at Interstate 35 (I-35) in Noble County (east of Enid) and ends in the western suburbs of Tulsa. The turnpike is part of US-412. It  also has a spur to the southwest to US-177 north of Stillwater.
The Creek Turnpike runs around the outskirts of Tulsa, forming a southern bypass of Tulsa's core area. The Creek Turnpike terminates at I-44 on both ends, and acts as a bridge between the Turner and Will Rogers Turnpikes.
The Gilcrease Turnpike is a  tolled extension of the Gilcrease Expressway in Tulsa, completing the west side of the Tulsa loop in 2022.
The H. E. Bailey Turnpike serves southwestern Oklahoma and is part of I-44. The H.E. Bailey turnpike has two separate parts, with a free section running through eastern Lawton. This turnpike connects Wichita Falls, Texas to Lawton, Chickasha, and Oklahoma City. It has a spur to the east, the Norman Spur, towards Newcastle and Goldsby.
The Indian Nation Turnpike passes through southeast Oklahoma, beginning at Hugo and angling northwest to end at I-40 south of Henryetta.
The Kickapoo Turnpike runs through eastern Oklahoma County and connects Interstate 44 on the northeast side of Oklahoma City to Interstate 40 on the southeast side.
The Kilpatrick Turnpike runs through the north and west sides of the Oklahoma City metro, running from I-40 to I-35/I-44, where it becomes the Turner Turnpike. This route acts as one quarter of a pseudo-beltway, proving access to the suburbs of Yukon and Edmond. An extension to SH-152 was completed in 2020.
The Muskogee Turnpike begins at SH-51 in Broken Arrow and continues southeast to Muskogee. A second section of the turnpike connects Muskogee to I-40 at Webbers Falls. The two sections are connected by a freeway, carrying part of SH-165.
The Turner Turnpike was Oklahoma's first turnpike, connecting Oklahoma City and Tulsa. The Turner Turnpike parallels historic US-66 (now SH-66), and carries I-44.
The Will Rogers Turnpike connects Tulsa to the Missouri state line near Joplin. Like the Turner Turnpike, this turnpike serves as a parallel route to US-66 and carries I-44. The rest area near Vinita is promoted as containing the World's Largest McDonald's.

Surveyed but not built
Shortly after the Turner Turnpike was built in 1953, the Oklahoma Turnpike Authority proposed other toll roads including one to be built from Oklahoma City north to the Kansas border near Braman to tie in with the southern terminus of the Kansas Turnpike at the state line. That routing was included as part of the Federal Highway Act of 1956 which created the Interstate Highway System. As a result, the OTA could not obtain financing to build that proposed turnpike and turned the initial plans including surveys and blueprints over to the Oklahoma Department of Transportation in 1956 for the construction of I-35 as a freeway on that same alignment, which was completed in several stages between 1958 and 1962.

Also proposed but never built was a toll road roughly following what would later become I-35 between Oklahoma City and the Red River north of Gainesville, Texas that included a spur route veering from the main route north of Ardmore veering northeastward past Ada to tie in with the Turner Turnpike near Stroud, Oklahoma.

Also proposed in the 1990s but never built was an extension of the Muskogee Turnpike from its current southeastern terminus at I-40 southeastward toward Poteau.

Payment methods

Pikepass 
Pikepass is the electronic toll collection system used by the Oklahoma Turnpike Authority. Created in 1990 and launched on January 1, 1991, Pikepass provides an alternative to paying cash tolls. Most customers pay an initial $40 in prepaid tolls, which they can refill at their own convenience or have funds automatically withdrawn to replenish the account if it falls below a threshold. Pikepass usage results in a 5% savings up front and customers with 20 or more uses of the Pikepass receive a credit of 5% of their toll charges for that month.

Interoperability
As of May 2019, Pikepass can be used on all turnpikes in Kansas and Texas as well as Oklahoma.

PlatePay 
On July 25, 2021, toll collection booths on the Kilpatrick Turnpike were closed and replaced with the new cashless pay-by-mail system known as PlatePay. Customers using PlatePay travel in the same lanes as customers when passing through a toll plaza. Instead of the toll being deducted from an account, drivers are mailed an invoice for their toll which is paid through an online portal or by check. Due to added costs with the new system, PlatePay toll rates are 75 percent higher on average than the previous cash rates. On January 25, 2022, the Kickapoo Turnpike closed its toll collection booths to begin PlatePay operations. On June 21, 2022, the H. E. Bailey Turnpike from Lawton to Oklahoma City and its spur to Norman went cashless. The remainder of the turnpike from Lawton to Texas was converted on July 27, 2022. On August 16, 2022, the Chicksaw Turnpike went cashless. The Oklahoma Turnpike Authority plans to implement cashless tolling through PlatePay on all turnpikes by 2025.

Criticism
The turnpike system has received criticism from many, most notably from Gary Richardson, former U.S. Attorney and candidate for Governor of Oklahoma in 2002 and 2018, who has called for the abolition of the Turnpike Authority. Critics have noted the lack of revenue from turnpikes that actually goes to the state of Oklahoma.  The OTA counters that it receives no tax money to maintain, operate, and pay off the turnpike system; and, if the state had to pay routine maintenance and capital rehabilitation on the turnpikes, the cost to the government would be an additional $105 million annually.

References

 
Freeways in the United States
Lists of roads in Oklahoma